Abdullah Al-Qwabani (born 2 March 1999) is a male Yemeni long-distance runner. He competed in the 5000 metres event at the 2015 World Championships in Athletics in Beijing, China.

In 2017, he competed in the junior men's race at the 2017 IAAF World Cross Country Championships held in Kampala, Uganda.

See also
 Yemen at the 2015 World Championships in Athletics

References

Place of birth missing (living people)
1999 births
Living people
Yemeni male long-distance runners
World Athletics Championships athletes for Yemen
Yemeni male cross country runners
21st-century Yemeni people